The Men's 100 Backstroke event at the 10th FINA World Aquatics Championships swam 21 – 22 July 2003 in Barcelona, Spain. Preliminary and Semifinal heats swam on July 21; the Final was held on July 22.

At the start of the event, the existing World (WR) and Championship (CR) records were:
WR: 53.60 swum by Lenny Krayzelburg (USA) on August 24, 1999 in Sydney, Australia
CR: 54.31 swum by Matt Welsh (Australia) on July 23, 2001 in Fukuoka, Japan

Results

Final

Semifinals

Preliminaries

References

Swimming at the 2003 World Aquatics Championships